Fernando Trexo y Senabria, O.F.M. or Hernando de Trejo y Sanabria (1547–1614) was a Roman Catholic prelate who served as Bishop of Córdoba (1595–1614).

Biography
Fernando Trexo y Senabria was born in Asunción, Paraguay in 1547 and ordained a priest in the Order of Friars Minor in 1576. On 13 January 1578, he was appointed during the papacy of Pope Gregory XIII as Bishop of Córdoba. On 16 May 1595, he was consecrated bishop by Luis López de Solís, Bishop of Quito.  He served as Bishop of Córdoba until his death on 24 December 1614.

References

16th-century Roman Catholic bishops in Argentina
Bishops appointed by Pope Gregory XIII
People from Asunción
1547 births
1614 deaths
17th-century Roman Catholic bishops in Argentina
Roman Catholic bishops of Córdoba
Franciscan bishops